The 2013 Toronto Argonauts season was the 56th season for the team in the Canadian Football League and their 141st season overall. The Argonauts finished in first place in the East Division with an 11–7 record, but their hopes of repeating their 2012 Grey Cup championship were ended by a 36–24 loss to the Hamilton Tiger-Cats in the East Final.

Offseason

CFL draft 
The 2013 CFL Draft took place on May 6, 2013. The Argonauts had five selections in the seven-round draft, after trading their fourth round pick to the Hamilton Tiger-Cats and trading their third round pick to the Edmonton Eskimos for two fifth round picks. The club, in turn, traded three fifth round picks to Saskatchewan for a third round pick.

Preseason

Regular season

Standings

Schedule
 Win
 Loss
 Tie

Postseason

Schedule

Playoff bracket

*-Team won in Overtime.

Team

Roster

Coaching staff

References

External links
2013 Toronto Argonauts at Official Site

Toronto Argonauts seasons
Toro